Antonello Silverini (b. 21 August 1966, in Rome) is an Italian illustrator. He is the first illustrator awarded the MAM (Master of Art and Craft) prize. He has collaborated with Il Sole 24 Ore, La Repubblica, Panorama, l'Espresso, The Boston Globe, The Economist and The Washington Post and has designed book covers for several novels including those of Ian McEwan for Einaudi and Philip K. Dick for Fanucci.

In 2017, Prof Carmelo Occhipinti focused on his work in the volume "Antonello Silverini. Quello che si vede" was included in the Monographs series of Horti Hesperidum, published under the patronage of the Department of Literary, Philosophical, and Art History of the University of the studies of Rome "Tor Vergata".

Biography 

Silverini has worked with various Italian and international agencies. In 2002, his works were selected for the 25th annual American Showcase. His work was also covered by the media in 2005 by Il Sole 24 Ore and La Repubblica, in the same year won an Academia Pictor award in Turin, and in 2006 he received the Zavrel prize. In 2007, his works were selected for the Lürzer's Archive Special 200 Best Illustrators worldwide.

Since "La Lettura" (the Sunday supplement of the Corriere della Sera) was refounded, Silverini has become one of its leading illustrators.

In 2012, he designed the artwork for the Rome Film Festival, and also produced art for a video animation that was part of the advertising campaign. After illustrating covers for Doris Lessing novels in 2013, Fanucci Editore asked him to illustrate covers for Philip K. Dick novels for the celebration of its 25th anniversary. At the 66th Cannes Film Festival, he designed the poster for Ophelia, the short film by Annarita Zambrano, which was in competition for the Palme d'Or. In 2015, the Einaudi publishing house chose Silverini along with Noma Bar and Shout for the graphic restyling of the book collection Super ET. The Italian book covers of Ian McEwan's novels are also designed by Antonello Silverini.

Ascanio Celestini chose Silverini imagery for the poster of his film Lunga vita alla sposa, presented in 2015 at the Venice International Film Festival. In 2016, Silverini was in Le eccellenze creative del fumetto e dell'illustrazione di Roma e Lazio (The creative excellence of comics and illustration of Rome and Lazio), a catalog of young up-and-coming cartoonists and illustrators. The volume was presented for the first time at a comic convention: The Festival international de la bande dessinée d'Angoulême.

He currently teaches graphic art and illustration at the Università di Tor Vergata e Accademia di Belle Arti di Roma.

Awards and prizes 

American Showcase 25 (2002)
"Teatrio" Chioggia – ITA (2004)
Accademia Pictor di Torino – ITA (2005)
Premio Zavrel – ITA (2006)
"Bollicine d'Artista" – ITA (2006)
"Teatrio" Chioggia – ITA (2006)
Lürzer's Archive Special the 200 Best Illustrators Worldwide (2007)
Selected—Master Cup International Cartoon and Illustration Biennial – China (2011)
Selected—Kyoto International Cartoon Exhibition – JAPAN (2012)
MAM (Maestro d’Arte e Mestiere) – Fondazione Cologni (2016)

Exhibitions 

Venice Design Art Gallery – Venice (2007)
Illustrabilia '08 – Padoa (2008)
25 anniiversario Philip Dick (Libreria Fanucci) – Rome (2008)
Galleria 105 Art – Rome (2009)
Fuori dal Quotidiano (Rosso20sette Arte Contemporanea) – Rome (2014)
Aiuto mi sono perso (Tapirulan) – Cremona (2014)
Ruvidezze (Catravetra) – Florence (2015)
33T (Tapirulan) – Cremona (2016)
Quello che si vede (Villa Reale) – Monza (2016)
 Il Colore delle Parole - La Triennale - Milano (2017)
2019 - Nello spazio e nel tempo - Palazzo del Monte di Pietà - Forl
2020 - "RODARIANA" La Fantasia non è un lupo cattivo - Morano Calabro/ Castrovillari

References 

Italian illustrators
1966 births
Living people
Artists from Rome